Mohammad Ramdhan Pomanto, also known as Danny Pomanto, (born 30 January 1964) is an Indonesian politician who is the mayor of Makassar, the fourth largest extended metropolitan area in Indonesia.

Pomanto is a graduate of the faculty of engineering at Hasanuddin University, where he also served as a lecturer prior to holding office. He has developed over six hundred architectural designs in over seventy cities and regencies. He was elected as Mayor of Makassar following local elections in 2013, where he won 31.18% of the votes (182,484 votes). He tried to run for a second term in the 2018 election, but his candidacy was disputed and he was declared ineligible to run, with his competitor facing and losing to an empty ballot.

He ran again in 2020 with the support of Nasdem Party and Gerindra Party, and won a second term after securing 41.3% of votes.

References

1964 births
Living people
People from Makassar
Hasanuddin University alumni
Mayors of Makassar
Mayors of places in Indonesia